Walnut Creek is an unincorporated community and census-designated place (CDP) in Mohave County, in the U.S. state of Arizona. The population was 571 at the 2020 census.

Geography
Interstate 40 passes to the east of the community, with access from Exit 44. County Highway 10 (Oatman Road) is the main road through the CDP.

Demographics

References

Census-designated places in Mohave County, Arizona
Census-designated places in Arizona